The Dabbs Site is an archaeological site located on a terrace in Cartersville, Georgia in the United States. It is a small excavation area where villages were historically established near flood plains along rivers and streams. The previous inhabitants and their specific cultural group are unknown, however, they left behind evidence of their practices in agriculture, hunting, and pottery making.

Geologic setting

The Dabbs Site is in proximity to two other sites called the Etowah Indian Mounds and above the Etowah River. The Dabbs site is a small area of about 720 feet in elevation, 120 m in length (from north to south), and 115 in width (from east to west). It has an agricultural field with a flat landscape and is surrounded by forest. The site is located in the broader Great Valley District of the Ridge and Valley Providence in Georgia, containing soil that is commonly silt loam topsoil with maroon hues that contain clay subsoil with dark red hues due to mixing of plowing activity at around 35 cm deep. These soil types contain limestone, sandstone, and shale.

History

Sites located in Georgia have been categorized under the Woodland Period that has shown growth in populations, sedentism, and structures that were organized. The date ranges of the Early Woodland period between the Archaic period at around 9000 to 1000 BC to the Mississippian period at around AD 1000 to 1550. The Middle Woodland period is dated at 300 BC to AD 500 where people settled long-term in small villages around river floodplains or streams. People migrated seasonally and practiced intensified horticulture. The Late Woodland Period is dated at AD 400 to 1000 and had several advances in cultural practices and technology. It is described as a period in which people settled for longer terms, warfare and hierarchies arose, and intensification of maize production was initiated.

Excavation site analysis

The Dabbs Site was investigated in 2012 by Terry Powis from Kennesaw State University (KSU) in collaboration with a geophysical survey program directed by Sheldon Skaggs from Bronx Community College. KSU archaeologists used remote sensing methods and compared them to surface collection and shovel testing that had been used on the site. Ground Penetrating Radar (GPR) was one of the methods used to detect artifacts underground prior to excavating in which radar pulses are projected into the soil and reflect off artifacts, remains, or changes in soil. The data collected can then show a 3-D map of the area scrutinized. A magnetometer was another method used, which measures the relativity or strength of a change in magnetic field to a specific point or determine the magnetization of objects. The combination of these methods helped provide more effectiveness in mapping the excavation areas without excavating.

Structures and cultural artifacts

Remains of small, domestic village structures were commonly found during the Early to Middle Woodland periods at the Dabbs Site. They were commonly found around rivers or streams and the homes were built in round or oval shapes. The small structures were about 4–7 m in diameter. Larger structures had mound shapes and were interpreted as areas where more people gathered for ceremonies, events, or practiced burials. Burials were also found near caves with artifacts that suggested to be well-valued. Copper, mica adornments, marine artifacts, and ground stones were among many valuable items found at grave areas. Middle Woodland period findings included a majority of botanical domesticates and cultivates such as maize, squash, marsh-elder, and may grass. Pottery vessels categorized as Cartersville and Early Swift Creek were found at the Dabbs Site during this time period. Cartersville vessels found were large jars with tetra-podal supports and small bowls decorated with either check stamped or simple stamped decorations. The Swift Creek vessels found were conical-bottomed jars, flat bowls, curve-linear designs, and also tetra-podal supports for the vessels. During the Late Woodland period, house structures were found that were described to be round, measured 4–5 m in diameter, and had singular posts. Populations were suggested to have increased through the settlement depicted on flood plains of bigger rivers and terraces, which were widely scattered. Artifacts such as the bow and arrow were found, which suggested technological advances and warfare in the Late Woodland period. Evidence of intensive cultivation of maize was also found during this time period at the site.

Bibliography

T. (2020, February 12). Early Georgia PDF. Retrieved August 1, 2020, from https://fileinfo.com/extension/pdf

References 

Archaeological sites in Georgia (U.S. state)
Woodland period
Prehistory of the United States
Mississippian culture
Swift Creek culture
Excavations